This is the results breakdown of the local elections held in Extremadura on 28 May 1995. The following tables show detailed results in the autonomous community's most populous municipalities, sorted alphabetically.

City control
The following table lists party control in the most populous municipalities, including provincial capitals (shown in bold). Gains for a party are displayed with the cell's background shaded in that party's colour.

Municipalities

Almendralejo
Population: 26,587

Badajoz
Population: 130,153

Cáceres
Population: 80,235

Mérida
Population: 51,968

Plasencia
Population: 37,554

See also
1995 Extremaduran regional election

References

Extremadura
1995